Voctave is an 11-member a cappella group based in Central Florida, United States.  The group consists of several performers from the Voices of Liberty a cappella group at the American Adventure pavilion at the Epcot theme park at the Walt Disney World resort.  The group often performs intricate arrangements of music from Broadway, Disney, jazz standards, and Christmas music.  Among the unique characteristics which set the group apart from other a cappella groups is an extremely wide vocal range of 5 full octaves.

The group's arranger is Jamey Ray, who also teaches at Rollins College in Winter Park, Florida.  His arrangements blend classical group choral techniques with barbershop and gospel.  Tony De Rosa served as musical director for the group from its inception until he left the group in early 2020, along with J. C. Fullerton.  The group did not make an elaborate announcement of this change, with the last known mention of De Rosa and Fullerton being an advertisement for a concert in Texas for the Boerne Performing Arts organization. De Rosa was replaced as musical director by Bradley Roberts, one of the vocal captains in the "Voices of Liberty" at Walt Disney World's EPCOT.

Drew Ochoa and Aaron Stratton joined the group shortly after the departure of De Rosa and Fullerton and recorded several YouTube videos with the group during the early months of the COVID-19 pandemic in the spring of 2020.  They are also included on the group's latest album, The Corner of Broadway and Main Street, Volume 2, which peaked at #6 on the iTunes sales chart in its first week of sales.

Early career 
The group was informally created when Jamey Ray was recording an album of arrangements with a 12-member chorus.  He recorded the group singing a collection of Disney music and posted it to YouTube.  Based on the response and viewership, he organized a group of 11 singers to sing together at events independent of the Disney theme parks, at which nearly all of the members performed on a regular basis.  In early 2016, the group released their Disney Love Medley featuring Kirstin Maldonado of Pentatonix and Jeremy Michael Lewis, her then-boyfriend.  This video featured three songs about love (I See the Light from Tangled, You'll Be in My Heart from Tarzan, and Go the Distance from Hercules) and accumulated more than 30 million views .

Over the course of the next 4 years, Voctave released the self-titled album, numerous Christmas albums featuring both secular and religious music, two albums of the group performing with a symphony orchestra, and two spanning Broadway standards and Disney-themed arrangements.

Discography

Albums 

 The Spirit of the Season (2016)
 Voctave (2016)
 Snow (2017)
 The Corner of Broadway and Main Street (2017)
 Symphony Series (2019)
 Symphony Series - Christmas Edition (2019)
 Somewhere There's Music (2019)
 The Corner of Broadway and Main Street Vol. 2 (2020)
 The Spirit of the Season - Deluxe Edition (2021)
 Goodnight, My Someone (2022)

Singles 

 This Is My Wish (2015)
 All is Well (2015)
 Disney Love Medley (2016) -- featuring Kirstin Maldonado and Jeremy Michael Lewis

Other music 

 Mary, Did You Know? (2016) -- featuring Mark Lowry (songwriter)
 A Million Dreams (2018) -- collaboration with Vocal Majority
 Smile (2020)

Members

Current members 

 Kate Lott – soprano 1
 Ashley Espinoza – alto/soprano 
 Sarah Whittemore – alto 1
 Chrystal Johnson – alto 2
 E.JCardona – tenor 1 
 Bradley Roberts – musical director

References

External links 
 Official website

Professional a cappella groups
Musical groups from Florida